Saulo Ferreira Silva (born 20 April 1995), commonly known as Saulo, is a Brazilian footballer who currently plays as a goalkeeper for Londrina.

Career statistics

Club

Honours
Botafogo
 Campeonato Carioca: 2018

References

External links

1995 births
Living people
Footballers from Belo Horizonte
Brazilian footballers
Association football goalkeepers
Campeonato Brasileiro Série A players
Botafogo de Futebol e Regatas players
Vila Nova Futebol Clube players
Sport Club do Recife players